The Bampton Lectures at the University of Oxford, England, were founded by a bequest of John Bampton. They have taken place since 1780.

They were a series of annual lectures; since the turn of the 20th century they have typically been biennial. They continue to concentrate on Christian theological topics. The lectures have traditionally been published in book form. On a number of occasions, notably at points during the 19th century, they attracted great interest and controversy.

Lecturers (incomplete list)

1780–1799
 1780 – James Bandinel Eight Sermons preached before the University of Oxford
 1781 – Timothy Neve Eight Sermons preached before the University of Oxford
 1782 – Robert Holmes The Prophecies and Testimony of John the Baptist, and the parallel Prophecies of Jesus Christ
 1783 – John Cobb Eight sermons preached before the University of Oxford
 1784 – Joseph White Mahometism and Christianity
 1785 – Ralph Churton On the Prophecies Respecting the Destruction of Jerusalem
 1786 – George Croft Eight Sermons preached before the University of Oxford
 1787 – William Hawkins Discourses on Scripture Mysteries
 1788 – Richard Shepherd The Ground and Credibility of the Christian Religion
 1789 – Edward Tatham  Chart and Scale of Truth
 1790 – Henry Kett A Representation of the Conduct and Opinions of the Primitive Christians, with Remarks on Gibbon and Priestley
 1791 – Robert Morres Eight sermons preached before the University of Oxford
 1792 – John Eveleigh Eight Sermons Preached before the University of Oxford
 1793 – James WilliamsonThe Truth, Inspiration, Authority, and End of the Scriptures, considered and defended
 1794 – Thomas Wintle Expediency, Prediction, and Accomplishment of the Christian Redemption Illustrated
 1795 – Daniel Veysie The Doctrine of Atonement illustrated and defended
 1796 – Robert Gray, Sermons on the Principles Upon Which the Reformation of the Church of England was Established
 1797 – William Finch Objections of Infidel Historians and Other Writers Against Christianity
 1798 – Charles Henry Hall Fulness of Time
 1799 – William Barrow Answers to some Popular Objections against the Necessity or the Credibility of the Christian Revelation

1800–1824
 1800 – George Richards The Divine Origin of Prophecy Illustrated and Defended
 1801 – George Stanley Faber Horae Mosaicae
 1802 – George Frederic Nott Religious Enthusiasm
 1803 – John Farrer Sermons on the Mission and Character of Christ and on the Beatitudes
 1804 – Richard Laurence An attempt to illustrate those articles of the Church of England, which the Calvinists improperly consider as Calvinistical
 1805 – Edward Nares A View of the Evidences of Christianity at the End of the Pretended Age of Reason
 1806 – John Browne, Fellow of Corpus Christi College Sermons preached before the University of Oxford
 1807 – Thomas Le Mesurier The Nature and Guilt of Schism
 1808 – John Penrose An Attempt to Prove the Truth of Christianity
 1809 – John Bayley Somers Carwithen A view of the Brahminical religion
 1810 – Thomas Falconer Certain Principles in Evanson's Dissonance of the 'Four generally received Evangelists' 
 1811 – John Bidlake The Truth and Consistency of Divine Revelation
 1812 – Richard Mant An Appeal to the Gospel
 1813 – John Collinson A Key to the Writings of the Principal Fathers of the Christian Church who flourished during the first three centuries 
 1814 – William Van Mildert The General Principles of Scripture-Interpretation
 1815 – Reginald Heber The Personality and Office of the Christian Comforter
 1816 – John Hume Spry Christian Union Doctrinally and Historically Considered
 1817 – John Miller The Divine Authority of Holy Scripture
 1818 – Charles Abel Moysey The Doctrines of Unitarians Examined
 1819 – Hector Davies Morgan A Compressed View of the Religious Principles and Practices of the Age
 1820 – Godfrey Faussett The Claims of the Established Church to exclusive attachment and support, and the Dangers which menace her from Schism and Indifference, considered
 1821 – John Jones The Moral Tendency of Divine Revelation
 1822 – Richard Whately The Use and Abuse of Party Feeling in Matters of Religion
 1823 – Charles Goddard The Mental Condition Necessary to a due Inquiry into Religious Evidence
 1824 – John Josias Conybeare An Attempt to Trace the History and to Ascertain the Limits of the Secondary and Spiritual Interpretation of Scripture

1825–1849
 1825 – George Chandler The Scheme of Divine Revelation Considered
 1826 – William Vaux The Benefits Annexed to a Participation in the Two Christian Sacraments of Baptism and the Lord's Supper
 1827 – Henry Hart Milman Character and Conduct of the Apostles Considered as an Evidence of Christianity
 1828 – Thomas Horne The Religious Necessity of the Reformation
 1829 – Edward Burton Inquiry into the Heresies of the Apostolic Age
 1830 – Henry Soames An inquiry into the doctrines of the Anglo-Saxon church
 1831 – Thomas William Lancaster The Popular Evidence of Christianity
 1832 – Renn Dickson Hampden The Scholastic Philosophy considered in its relation to Christian Theology
 1833 – Frederick Nolan Analogy of Revelation and Science Established
 1834 – Richard Laurence An Attempt to illustrate those Articles of the Church of England which the Calvinists improperly consider as Calvinistical
 1836 – Charles Atmore Ogilvie Eight Sermons
 1837 – Thomas S. L. Vogan The Principal Objections against the Doctrine of the Triniy
 1838 – Henry Arthur Woodgate The Authoritative Teaching of the Church
 1839 – William Daniel Conybeare An analytical examination into ... the writings of the Christian Fathers during the Ante-Nicene period
 1840 – Edward Hawkins Connected Principles
 1841 – Samuel Wilberforce was invited to lecture butwithdrew following the death of his wife Emily
 1842 – James Garbett Christ, as Prophet, Priest, and King
 1843 – Anthony Grant The Past and Prospective Extension of the Gospel By Missions to the Heathen
 1844 – Richard Wiliam Jelf An inquiry into the means of grace, their mutual connection, and combined use, with especial reference to the Church of England
 1845 – Charles Abel Heurtley Justification
 1846 – Augustus Short The Witness of the Spirit with our Spirit
 1847 – Walter Augustus Shirley
 1848 – Edward Garrard Marsh The Christian Doctrine of Sanctification
 1849 – Richard Michell The Nature and Comparative Value of the Christian Evidences

1850–1874
 1850 – Edward Meyrick Goulburn The Resurrection of the Body
 1851 – Henry Bristow Wilson The Communion of Saints
 1852 – Joseph Esmond Riddle The Natural History of Infidelity and Superstition in contrast with Christian Faith
 1853 – William Thomson The Atoning Work of Christ viewed in Relation to some Ancient Theories
 1854 – Samuel Waldegrave New Testament Millenarianism
 1855 – John Ernest Bode The Absence of Precision in the Formularies of the Church of England
 1856 – Edward Arthur Litton The Mosaic Dispensation Considered as Introductory to Christianity
 1857 – William Edward Jelf Christian Faith, Comprehensive, not Partial; Definite, not Uncertain
 1858 – Henry Longueville Mansel The Limits of Religious Thought
 1859 – George Rawlinson Historic Evidence for the Truth of the Christian Records
 1860 – James Augustus Hessey On Sunday: its Origin, History, and Present Obligation
 1861 – John Sandford The Mission and Extension of the Church at Home
 1862 – Adam Storey Farrar A Critical History of Free Thought in reference to the Christian Religion
 1863 – John Hannah The Relation between the Divine and Human Elements in Holy Scripture
 1864 – Thomas Dehany Bernard The Progress of Doctrine in the New Testament
 1865 – James Bowling Mozley Miracles
 1866 – Henry Parry Liddon The Divinity of Our Lord and Saviour Jesus Christ
 1867 – Edward Garbett Dogmatic Faith, an inquiry into the relation subsisting between revelation and dogma
 1868 – George Moberly The Administration of the Holy Spirit in the Body of Christ
 1869 – Robert Payne Smith Prophecy a Preparation for Christ
 1870 – William Josiah Irons Christianity as Taught by St. Paul
 1871 – George Herbert Curteis Dissent, in Its Relation to the Church of England
 1872 – John Richard Turner Eaton The Permanence of Christianity
 1873 – Isaac Gregory Smith Characteristics of Christian Morality
 1874 – Stanley Leathes The Religion of the Christ

1875–1899
 1875 – William Jackson, FSA Fellow of Worcester College, Oxford The Doctrine of Retribution
 1876 – William Alexander The Witness of the Psalms to Christ and Christianity
 1877 – Charles Adolphus Row Christian evidences viewed in relation to modern thought
 1878 – Charles Henry Hamilton Wright Zechariah and his Prophecies Considered in Relation to Modern Criticism
 1879 – Henry Wace The Foundations of Faith
 1880 – Edwin Hatch The Origin of Early Christian Churches
 1881 – John Wordsworth The One Religion: truth, holiness and peace desired by the nations, and revealed by Jesus Christ
 1882 – Peter Goldsmith Medd The One Mediator
 1883 – William Henry Fremantle The World as the Subject of Redemption
 1884 – Frederick Temple The Relations between Religion and Science
 1885 – Frederic William Farrar The History of Interpretation
 1886 – Charles Bigg The Christian Platonists of Alexandria
 1887 – William Boyd Carpenter Permanent Elements of Religion
 1888 – Robert Edward Bartlett The Letter and the Spirit
 1889 – Thomas Kelly Cheyne The Origin and Contents of the Psalter
 1890 – Henry William Watkins Modern Criticism considered in its Relation to the Fourth Gospel
 1891 – Charles Gore The Incarnation of the Son of God
 1892 – Alfred Barry Some Light of Science on the Faith
 1893 – William Sanday Inspiration
 1894 – John Richardson Illingworth Personality, Human and Divine
 1895 – Thomas Banks Strong Christian Ethics
 1897 – Robert Lawrence Ottley Aspects of the Old Testament
 1899 – William Ralph Inge Christian Mysticism (online text)

1900–1949
 1901 – Archibald Robertson Regnum Dei
 1903 – William Holden Hutton The Influence of Christianity Upon National Character
 1905 – Frederick William Bussell Christian Theology and Social Progress
 1907 – James Hamilton Francis Peile Reproach of the Gospel: An Inquiry into the Apparent Failure of Christianity
 1909 – Walter Hobhouse Church and the World: in Idea and in History
 1911 – John Huntley Skrine Creed and the Creeds: Their Function in Religion
 1913 – George Edmundson The Church in Rome in the First Century
 1915 – Hastings Rashdall The Idea of Atonement in Christian Theology
 1920 – Arthur Cayley Headlam Doctrine of the Church and Christian Reunion
 1922 – Leighton Pullan Religion Since the Reformation
 1924 – Norman Powell Williams The Ideas of the Fall and of Original Sin
 1926 – Alfred Edward John Rawlinson New Testament Doctrine of the Christ
 1928 – Kenneth E. Kirk The Vision of God: The Christian Doctrine of the Summum Bonum 
 1930 – Laurence Grensted Psychology and God a study of the implications of recent psychology for religious belief and practice
 1932 – B. H. Streeter Buddha and the Christ
 1934 – Robert Henry Lightfoot History and Interpretation in the Gospels
 1936 – Frank Herbert Brabant Time and eternity in Christian thought
 1938 – Alfred Guillaume Prophecy and Divination among the Hebrews and other Semites
 1940 – George Leonard Prestige Fathers and Heretics 
 1942 – Trevor Gervase Jalland The Church and the Papacy: a Historical Study
 1944 – Spencer Leeson Christian Education
 1946 – Philip Arthur Micklem The Secular and the Sacred
 1948 – Austin Farrer The Glass of Vision

1950–1999
 1952 – Robert Leslie Pollington Milburn Early Christian Interpretations of History
 1954 – Henry Ernest William Turner The Pattern of Christian Truth: A Study in the Relations Between Orthodoxy and Heresy in the Early Church
 1955 – Thomas Maynard Parker Christianity and the State in the Light of History
 1956 – E. L. Mascall Christian Theology and Natural Science: Some Questions on their Relations
 1958 – John Gordon Davies He Ascended Into Heaven
 1960 - Eric Waldram Kemp "Counsel and Consent"
 1962 – Alan Richardson History Sacred and Profane
 1964 – Stephen Neill Church and Christian Union
 1966 – David Edward Jenkins The Glory of Man
 1968 – Frederick William Dillistone Traditional Symbols and the Contemporary World
 1970 – Cheslyn Jones Christ and Christianity: a study in origins in the light of St Paul
 1972 – Howard E. Root "The Limits of Radicalism"
 1974 – Peter Baelz The Forgotten Dream: Experience, Hope and God
 1976 – Geoffrey W. H. Lampe God As Spirit 
 1978 – A. R. Peacocke Creation and the World of Science
 1980 – Anthony E. Harvey Jesus and the Constraints of History
 1982 – Peter Hinchcliff Holiness and Politics 
 1984 – J. A. T. Robinson The Priority of John
 1986 – Maurice Wiles God's Action in the World
 1988 – John Barton "People of the Book?"
 1990 – Alister E. McGrath Genesis of Doctrine: a Study in the Foundations of Doctrinal Criticism
 1992 – Colin Gunton The One, the Three and the Many: God, Creation and the Culture of Modernity 
 1994 – Eric William Heaton The School Tradition of the Old Testament
 1996 – Ursula King Christ in All Things: Exploring Spirituality With Teilhard De Chardin

2000–present
 2000 – John Habgood Varieties of Unbelief
 2001 – David Fergusson Church, State and Civil Society 
 2003 – Oliver O'Donovan The Ways of Judgment 
 2005 – Paul S. Fiddes Seeing the world and knowing God: ancient wisdom and modern doctrine
 2007 – Raymond Plant Religion, Citizenship and Liberal Pluralism
 2009 – Richard Parish Catholic Particularity in Seventeenth-Century French Writing: Christianity is Strange 
 2011 – Frances Young
 From pondering scripture to the first principles of Christian Theology
 From cosmology to doxology: reading Genesis alongside Plato and Darwin
 From creation to re-creation: nature and the naked ape
 From image to likeness: incarnation and theosis
 From Adam and Eve to Mary and Christ: sin, redemption, atonement
 From inspiration to sanctification: the spirit of wisdom and holiness
 From the Church to Mary: towards a critical ecumenism
 From dogma to theoria: God as Trinity
 2013 – Michael Banner Imagining life: Christ and the human condition
 2015 – David F. Ford, Daring Spirit: John's Gospel Now
 2017 – George Pattison A Phenomenology of the Devout Life
 2019 – Peter Harrison Rethinking Relations Between Science and Religion YouTube
 2021 - Jessica Martin "Four-Dimensional Eucharist"

See also
 Bampton Lectures (Columbia University)
 Hulsean Lectures

References

External links
 Bampton Lectures from Project Canterbury with links to all known online Bampton Lectures
 
 General bibliography, good source for Bampton Lectures volumes (PDF)

1780 establishments in England
Recurring events established in 1780
Lecture series at the University of Oxford
Christian theological lectures
Lists of clerics